Zemamra is a town in Sidi Bennour Province, Casablanca-Settat, Morocco. According to the 2004 census it has a population of 11,896.

References

Populated places in Sidi Bennour Province
Municipalities of Morocco